Pymatuning Creek is a  long tributary to Shenango River Lake that rises in Ashtabula County, Ohio and flows south into Shenango Lake in Mercer County, Pennsylvania.  Pymatuning Creek forms most of the western side of Shenango Lake.  Pymatuning Creek has been designated as a Wild & Scenic River in Ohio.

References

External links
Pymatuning Creek in Ohio
Pymatuning Creek Wild & Scenic River

Rivers of Ashtabula County, Ohio
Rivers of Mercer County, Pennsylvania
Rivers of Ohio
Rivers of Pennsylvania
Rivers of Trumbull County, Ohio